is a deity in Japanese mythology. Grandson of the sun goddess Amaterasu, Ninigi is regarded according to Japanese mythology as the great-grandfather of Japan’s first emperor, Emperor Jimmu. The three sacred treasures brought with Ninigi from Heaven and divine ancestry established the Japanese Imperial Family.

The three generations of kami starting with Ninigi are sometimes referred to as the three generations of Hyūga, they are said to represent a transitional period between the heavenly kami and the first emperor.

Name and etymology 

Ninigi-no-Mikoto (瓊瓊杵尊), means "The Great God Ninigi." Another name of his is Ame-nigishi-kuni-nigishi-amatsuhiko-hiko-ho-no-ninigi-no-Mikoto (天邇岐志国邇岐志天津日高日子番能邇邇芸命) or "The Great God Ninigi, of the Imperial State, The Child of the Sun of Many Talents." Ninigi is speculated to be translated as "beloved jeweled mallet."

Myths

Birth 
Ninigi was born from Ame-no-oshihomimi and Takuhadachiji-hime. Takamimusubi, treated him with special affection, and nurtured him with great regard.

Sent to rule 
Depending on the version Amaterasu sends Ninigi to rule either after his father refuses the offer, after several failures, or to replace Ōkuninushi after his troubled rule.

In many stories, Ninigi receives three gifts. The sword Kusanagi, the mirror Yata no Kagami, and the jewel Yasakani no Magatama.

Descent to earth 

Ninigi's descent to earth appears in both the Nihon Shoki and the Kojiki. In a earlier version of the Nihon Shoki Ninigi descends to earth unaccompanied.

But in a later version of the Nihon Shoki and the Kojiki, other gods accompany Ninigi’s journey to earth; who accompanies him and how many depends on the version. But it usually includes the following gods: Uzume, Sarutahiko, Ame-no-Koyane, Futodama, Ishikori dome, and Tamanoya; many of these deities would later become the ancestors of many clans like Sarume clan , Nakatomi clan, Shinabe clan, and Inbe clan.

Ninigi tries to go to earth but he is blocked by Sarutahiko. Uzume then persuades Sarutahiko to let Ninigi pass.

In most versions Ninigi descents to earth landing on to Mt. Takachiho located on the island of Kyushu in Kagoshima Prefecture where Ninigi built his palace there.

Loss of immortality 
One story involves Ninigi looking for a wife; he meets this mountain god named Oyamatsumi, Oho-Yama presents Ninigi his two daughters Konohana and Iwa-Naga. However, Ninigi rejects Iwa-Naga for her looks and is cursed for rejecting Iwa-Naga. Now he and his descendants will live shorter lives.

Birth of Ninigi’s children 
Soon after Ninigi and Konohanasakuya-hime got married, Konohanasakuya-hime got pregnant.
Ninigi accused his wife of adultery. In many versions his wife decided to go in to a hut and set the hut on fire to prove that she was a faithful wife. Konohanasakuya-hime and her sons survived, she gave birth to three sons named Hoderi, Hoori, and Hosuseri.

One variation says that Konohanasakuya-hime gave birth to Hoderi in the hut and had the other two children later.

Death 

Later on, Ninigi died and was buried at E no Goriyo.

Family

Ninigi is said to be the nephew to Futotama and Ame-no-Koyane.

Ninigi is in the Three generations of Hyuga a time period between  Tenson kōrin and Jimmu's Eastern Expedition.

Children 

Most stories state that Ninigi had three sons Hoderi, Hosuseri, and Hoori. However, other ancient Japanese texts say that he had four sons and lists "Hikohohodemi no mikoto" as the fourth child of Ninigi. However, it isn’t clear if Hikohohodemi is a fourth child or another name of Hoori.

According to Nihongi, Tamanoya is a offspring of Ninigi.

Worship of Ninigi

Shrines 
Ninigi has very few temples where he is enshrined.

Shrines like Amatsu Shrine and Kirishima-jingu Shrine are dedicated to Ninigi.

At Ise shrine, Ninigi is said to be worshipped with Kunitokotachi.

See also 
Tamanooya-no-Mikoto

References

Japanese gods
Shinto kami
Amatsukami